A Foreign Woman is a novel by the Russian writer Sergei Dovlatov. It is the first author's book about life in America.

Plot introduction
The story is set in New York City in the 1980s and begins with a description of the narrator's neighbourhood and the Russian immigrants who live there. It then moves back in time and over to the Soviet Union to describe a young woman called Marusia Tatarovich who, in time, emigrates to United States.

Publication history
The book was published in New York by Russica Publishers in 1986.

References

1986 Russian novels
Novels by Sergei Dovlatov
Novels set in New York City